This is a timeline of the Xiongnu, a nomadic people that dominated the ancient eastern Eurasian steppes from 209 BC to 89 AD. The Xiongnu settled down in northern China during the late 3rd century AD following the Three Kingdoms period, and founded several states lasting until the Northern Liang was conquered by the Xianbei Northern Wei in 439 AD.

4th century BC

3rd century BC

2nd century BC

1st century BC

1st century

2nd century

3rd century

4th century

5th century

References

Bibliography

 (alk. paper)

 

History of Mongolia